Le Val-Saint-François is a regional county municipality in the Estrie region of Quebec, Canada. The seat is Richmond.

Subdivisions
There are 18 subdivisions within the RCM:

Cities & Towns (3)
 Richmond
 Valcourt
 Windsor

Municipalities (10)
 Bonsecours
 Maricourt
 Racine
 Saint-Claude
 Saint-Denis-de-Brompton
 Saint-François-Xavier-de-Brompton
 Sainte-Anne-de-la-Rochelle
 Stoke
 Ulverton
 Val-Joli

Townships (3)
 Cleveland
 Melbourne
 Valcourt

Villages (2)
 Kingsbury
 Lawrenceville

Demographics

Population

Language

Transportation

Access Routes
Highways and numbered routes that run through the municipality, including external routes that start or finish at the county border:

 Autoroutes
 

 Principal Highways
 
 

 Secondary Highways
 
 
 
 
 

 External Routes
 None

See also
 List of regional county municipalities and equivalent territories in Quebec

References